Foard may refer to:

Places
Foard County, Texas, a county of Texas, United States

People with the surname
Aubrey Foard, American classical tubist
Glenn Foard, English archaeologist